Shelmerston may refer to:

 Shelmerston, a fictional town based upon Appledore, a village in Devon
 Shelmerston, a fictional island town in I Am Dead